Jane Sourza (1902–1969) was a French stage and film actress. She was in a long-term relationship with the actor Raymond Souplex.

Selected filmography
 Radio Surprises (1940)
 An Artist with Ladies (1952)
 Naked in the Wind (1953)
 Four Days in Paris (1955)
 Love in Jamaica (1957)
 Babes a GoGo (1966)

References

Bibliography
 Goble, Alan. The Complete Index to Literary Sources in Film. Walter de Gruyter, 1999.

External links

1902 births
1969 deaths
French film actresses
French stage actresses
Actresses from Paris
20th-century French actresses